Mount Yong Belar (Jawi: ڬونوڠ يوڠ بلار‌) is a mountain on the border of the states Kelantan and Perak in the Titiwangsa Mountains of Malaysia.

See also
 List of mountains of Malaysia
 List of Ultras of Southeast Asia

References

External links
 "Gunung Yong Belar, Malaysia" on Peakbagger

Yong Belar
Yong Belar
Titiwangsa Mountains